Frederick Greystock Robertson (7 March 1909 – 17 September 2002) was a Liberal party member of the House of Commons of Canada.

Robertson was born in Belleville, Ontario and became a physician after receiving his MD degree at the University of Toronto. After working as a doctor in Cobourg, Ontario, he left his practice in July 1948 to work in the canning industry, eventually owning and managing the Cobourg-based Robertson Packers.

He was first elected to Parliament at the Northumberland riding in the 1949 general election and was re-elected for a second term in 1953. Robertson was defeated by Ben Thompson of the Progressive Conservative party in the 1957 election.

Robertson's father, William George Robertson, was a Liberal member of the Ontario Legislature between 1926 and 1929.

References

External links
 

1909 births
2002 deaths
Physicians from Ontario
Liberal Party of Canada MPs
Members of the House of Commons of Canada from Ontario
University of Toronto alumni
Politicians from Belleville, Ontario